Ernst Fischer (10 April 1900, Magdeburg, Germany - 10 July 1975 Locarno, Switzerland; buried Ronco sopra Ascona, Switzerland) was a German composer of operettas, film music, orchestral suites, songs, and piano works, and is best known for his large scale light music compositions.

From 1916 to 1922, Fischer was a student at the Hoch Conservatory in Frankfurt and the Stern Conservatory in Berlin. In 1926, he became a Berlin silent film organist and author of cinema music. He composed a number of piano solos in the then-popular idiom of novelty piano. He also was an arranger for the works of others, such as Carl Robrecht.

In the 1930s, Fischer became a popular radio composer, whose concert pieces were played by many light orchestras. He became well-known to radio listeners from the 1930s to 1960s. Although he wrote numerous piano pieces, perhaps his most famous work is the orchestral suite Südlich der Alpen (South of the Alps). He was also well known as the performer on the Grand Odeon organ; he performed under the name of Marcel Palotti between 1930 and 1937.

External links
 performed by the Hungarian Gypsy Orchestra. ISWC code T-802.076.347-8
 Performed by pianist Alex Hassan.
Sunny Morning - a CD of piano works performed by Alex Hassan.
South of the Alps - a CD of orchestral works performed by Rundfunkorchester Berlin.
Short biography in German of Ernst Fischer
"Sparkling Champagne" by Claudio Abbado & Berlin Philharmonic in Classic Arts Showcase

1900 births
1975 deaths
20th-century German composers
20th-century German male musicians
20th-century German pianists
20th-century organists
German film score composers
German male composers
German male organists
German male pianists
German operetta composers
Light music composers
Male film score composers
Male operetta composers
Ragtime composers
Ragtime pianists